The 2002 Kazakhstan Premier League was the 11th season of the Kazakhstan Premier League, the highest football league competition in Kazakhstan, and took place between 28 April and 24 October.

Teams
No teams were promoted from the Kazakhstan First Division, and with Ekibastuzets-NK, Zhetysu, Taraz, Dostyk and Mangystau relegated the previous season the league was reduced to 12 teams. Before the start of the season Shakhter-Ispat-Karmet were renamed Shakhter Karagandy.

Team overview

First round

League table

Results

Second round

Championship round

Results

Relegation round

Results

Season statistics

Top scorers

References

Kazakhstan Premier League seasons
1
Kazakh
Kazakh